Kota Uda Express is a 2017 Sri Lankan comedy film directed by A.A Junaideen and produced by Bright Films. The film stars Tennyson Cooray and Dilhani Ekanayake in lead roles along with Dayasiri Hettiarachchi, Ananda Athukorale in supportive roles. The film screened on 31 March 2017, without a prior media publicity, as said by the director. It is the 1272nd Sri Lankan film in the Sinhala cinema.

Cast
 Tennyson Cooray as Weere
 Dilhani Ekanayake as Pabawathi
 Dayasiri Hettiarachchi as Buddadhasa
 Ananda Athukorale as Sadiris
 Harith Wasala as Raja
 Gamini Mendis
 Giriraj Kaushalya
 Nayomi Thakshila as Susila
 Renuka Mayadunne
 Abinav AK

Songs

References

2017 films
2010s Sinhala-language films